Manitoba Opera is an opera company in Winnipeg, Manitoba that was founded in 1969.  Its first production was a concert version of Giuseppe Verdi's Il Trovatore in 1972. Manitoba Opera is one of several western Canadian opera companies that flourished under the so-called "father of opera in Western Canada," Irving Guttman.  He has been instrumental in the development of many young Canadian singers, including Winnipeg native Tracy Dahl (soprano) and Winkler's Phillip Ens (bass).  Both have gone on to international careers.

Live music for Manitoba Opera productions is provided by the Winnipeg Symphony Orchestra.

In November 2007, the company staged its first original production, Transit of Venus, composed by Victor Davies, with a libretto by Maureen Hunter, based on her stage play of the same name.

Manitoba Opera is based at the Centennial Concert Hall.

Larry Desrochers has been the General Director since November 2000.

References

External links
 

Musical groups established in 1969
Canadian opera companies
Musical groups from Winnipeg
1969 establishments in Manitoba